Songling (松岭区 ; pinyin : Sōnglǐng Qū) is an administrative subdivision which, although administered by Daxing'anling Prefecture, in the province of Heilongjiang, forms part of the Oroqin Autonomous Banner in Inner Mongolia, which is not an official administrative entity.

Administrative divisions 
Songling District is divided into 3 towns. 
3 towns
 Xiaoyangqi
 Jinsong
 Guyuan

See also

Notes and references 

Songling
Internal territorial disputes